First Day of My Life may refer to:

"First Day of My Life" (The Rasmus song), 2003
"First Day of My Life" (Bright Eyes song), 2005
"First Day of My Life" (Melanie C song), 2004